Michael Udvardi is an American plant biologist currently the chief scientific officer at the Noble Research Institute and an elected fellow of the American Association for the Advancement of Science since 2012. A highly cited expert in the last half-decade, his current interests are symbiosis and crops relationships.

Education
He graduated with a Ph.D. degree from Australian National University in 1989.

Publications
Genome-wide identification and testing of superior reference genes for transcript normalization in Arabidopsis, Plant physiology, 2005
Genome-Wide Reprogramming of Primary and Secondary Metabolism, Protein Synthesis, Cellular Growth Processes, and the Regulatory Infrastructure of Arabidopsis in Response to Nitrogen, Plant physiology, 2004
The Medicago genome provides insight into the evolution of rhizobial symbioses, Nature, 2011
Real‐time RT‐PCR profiling of over 1400 Arabidopsis transcription factors: unprecedented sensitivity reveals novel root‐and shoot‐specific genes, The Plant Journal, 2004

References

20th-century American botanists
21st-century American botanists
Living people
Australian National University alumni
Year of birth missing (living people)
Place of birth missing (living people)
Fellows of the American Association for the Advancement of Science